Benarty Hill, locally simply Benarty, rises above and to the west of Ballingry, in the west of Fife, Scotland. The summit ridge forms the boundary with Perth and Kinross. It is a prominent feature of the view from the M90 motorway, and from Kinross and Loch Leven. The lower slopes are steep on all sides, but the extensive heath around the summit is relatively flat.

From the north you can walk over the hill via the Sleeping Giant path accessed from RSPB Loch Leven visitors centre. The summit is easily accessible from its south side, where tracks and paths lead through the forest and up onto the summit heath. There are views across Loch Leven to the Lomond Hills, and across the Firth of Forth to the Lammermuir Hills and Pentland Hills. Distant views to the north and west are dominated by the Southern Highlands; on a clear day the profile of the Isle of Arran may be visible 80 miles to the west.

References

Marilyns of Scotland
Hills of Fife
Mountains and hills of Perth and Kinross